SG Wanna Be+ is SG Wannabe's first Korean studio album, released on January 20, 2004. It was produced by Lee Kyung-sub, Park Geun-tae and other famous music producers in South Korea. The group gained a reputation for being quite mysterious because they did not show their faces and did not star in any of their music videos. Nevertheless, their vocal abilities attracted many fans, and the album was an instant hit with pre-sales of 90,000 copies. Later in 2004, the group was recognized for their vocal ability with numerous awards, including the PAVV Best Newcomer at the Golden Disk Awards and the Seoul Popular Music Awards. Their music video also won Best Picture. The album has sold a total of 211,918 copies.

Music videos
A total of four music videos were produced for this album, "Timeless" and "I Loved You To Death", which was a two-part music video, "Don't Know Why" and "It was Good That We Loved".

The title track's music video for the album attracted media attention, as it featured top actors such as Sol Kyung-gu and Kim Nam-jin, and actresses Kim Yun-jin, Kang Hye-jung, and Seo Sung-min. The production costs were reportedly about 2 billion won. "Timeless" was the first part of the drama MV, while "I Loved You To Death" was the second part.

Notable tracks

"Timeless"
"Timeless" was SG Wannabe's debut track and was written by Kang Eun-kyung and composed by Park Geun-tae. The song is a medium-tempo R&B track.

"I Loved You to Death"
"I Loved You to Death" was also potentially SG Wannabe's debut track. Instead, "Timeless" became SG Wannabe's debut track. The ballad, "I Loved You to Death" was the group's sub-title track.

Track listing

Special Edition

SG Wannabe albums
Stone Music Entertainment albums
2004 debut albums